During the 1996–97 English football season, Nottingham Forest F.C. competed in the FA Premier League (known as the FA Carling Premiership for sponsorship reasons).

Season summary
After a Kevin Campbell hat-trick earnt Nottingham Forest an impressive 3–0 away win at Coventry City on the season's opening game, an appalling 4–1 home defeat to Premiership newcomers Sunderland prompted a dismal start to the season which saw them fail to win any of their next 16 league games until a shock 2–1 home win over title contenders Arsenal on 21 December 1996. Ultimately, Forest were bottom of the Premiership by Christmas, and their manager Frank Clark gone, with Stuart Pearce taking over as player-manager on a temporary basis. A good run of form in January saw Pearce receive the Manager of the Month award and Forest lifted out of the relegation zone, but, by the time he stepped down to make way for Dave Bassett in March, Forest had endured another setback and were left needing a miracle to beat the drop. The acquisition of Dutch striker Pierre van Hooijdonk did little to change the club's fortunes, and they were relegated in bottom place, seven points adrift of safety. They would have escaped relegation had it not been for dropping 32 points from 16 draws throughout the league season.

Final league table

Results summary

Results by round

Results
Nottingham Forest's score comes first

Legend

FA Premier League

FA Cup

League Cup

Squad

Left club during season

Reserve squad

Transfers

In

Out

Transfers in:  £8,500,000
Transfers out:  £675,000
Total spending:  £7,825,000

References

Nottingham Forest F.C. seasons
Nottingham Forest